Srigim (. lit. Shoots), also known as Li On, is a community settlement in central Israel. Located to the south of Beit Shemesh. It falls under the jurisdiction of Mateh Yehuda Regional Council. It borders the British Park forest and the biblical Elah Valley where David fought Goliath.

History
The village was established in 1960 by residents of moshavim in the region, and was planned to become a regional centre. It was named after grapevines, which are common in the area. The land had previously belonged to the depopulated Palestinian village of 'Ajjur.

In 1996 Srigim was enlarged to include 200 families who sought to turn it into an ecological village. It boasts dozens of artists and hosts an arts fair twice a year. It has a boutique winery, a microbrewery and an olive oil mill.

Notable residents
Benny Morris

References

External links
Srigim Winery 
Srigim Brewery 

Community settlements
Populated places established in 1960
Populated places in Jerusalem District
1960 establishments in Israel